Maxillaria lindleyana, or Lindley's maxillaria, is a species of orchid occurring from Brazil to Peru.

References

External links 

lindleyana
Orchids of Brazil
Orchids of Peru